Novato Hamilton station is a Sonoma–Marin Area Rail Transit station in Novato, California. It opened to preview service on June 29, 2017; full commuter service commenced on August 25, 2017. It is located on the south side of the city near Hamilton Parkway, from which the station takes its name. This was one of two stations planned for Novato in the Initial Operating Segment of SMART service; a third in Downtown Novato opened in December 2019.

References

External links

SMART - Stations

Railway stations in the United States opened in 2017
Sonoma-Marin Area Rail Transit stations in Marin County
Novato, California